Disorder of written expression is a type of learning disability in which a person's writing ability falls substantially below normally expected range based on the individual's age, educational background, and measured intelligence. Poor writing skills must interfere significantly with academic progress or daily activities that involves written expression (spelling, grammar, handwriting, punctuation, word usage, etc.). This disorder is also generally concurrent with disorders of reading and/or mathematics, as well as disorders related to behavior. Since it is so often associated with other learning disorders and mental problems, it is uncertain whether it can appear by itself; and dysgraphia can be considered to be a specific form of the disorder. The prevalence of disorder of written expression is estimated to be of a similar frequency to other learning disorders, between 3 - 5%. A diagnosis can be made based on results of several assessments.

Signs and symptoms
Multiple spelling mistakes
Errors in grammar and punctuation
Exceptionally poor or illegible writing
Sentences that lack cohesion
Reluctance or refusal to complete writing tasks
Anxiety or frustration (breaking pencils, tearing up homework assignments)

Causes
Specific causes of this disorder are unknown. The interaction of physical, psychological, and environmental factors is thought to contribute to the disorder of written expression. In neuropsychological and neurobiological research, some studies show evidence that abnormally high testosterone levels and abnormalities in cognitive processes (visual-motor, linguistic, attentional, and memory) are thought to play a role in learning disorder cases. The impact of brain injuries in both children and adults can impair any of these cognitive processes.

Other disabilities

 Dyslexia
 Reading disability
 Expressive language disorder
 Mathematics disorder
 Developmental coordination disorder
 Traumatic brain injury

Diagnosis
Oral and Written Language Scales (OWLS)
Test of Adolescent and Adult Language–3 (TOAL-3)
Test of Early Written Language
Test of Written Expression (TOWE)
Test of Written Language–3 (TOWL-3)
Woodcock Johnson Psychoeducational Battery–Revised, Tests of Achievement
Weschler Individual Achievement Test (WIAT)

Treatment
Although disorder for written expressions skills can be difficult and an enduring problem all throughout childhood into adulthood, different types of treatment and support can help individuals who have this disorder to employ strategies and skills in the home and school environment. This includes remedial education tailored to improve specific skills, providing special academic services in the learning environment, and addressing concurrent health and mental issues. It is sometimes necessary to foster motivational techniques to maintain motivation and minimize negative thoughts or feelings. Using whatever modifications are necessary to overcome fears of failure in the early stages of writing mediation is strongly encouraged because children with learning disabilities often experience low self-esteem and confidence, which may further interfere with learning and academic success.

References

External links 

Neurodevelopmental disorders